ʿAbd Allāh al-Raḍī, (actual name: Abu ʿAlī al-Ḥusayn ibn Aḥmad ibn ʿAbd Allāh ibn Muḥammad ibn Ismāʿīl (born 219 AH, died 268AH or 881 AD in Askar, Syria; Imamate: 225–268AH) surnamed al-Raḍī/al-Zakī) is the tenth Isma'ili Imam. He is son and successor to the ninth Imam, Ahmad ibn Abd Allah (Muhammad al-Taqi), and the father of Abd Allah al-Mahdi Billah, the Imam who founded the Fatimid Caliphate.

The eighth to tenth Isma'ili Imams were hidden from the public because of threats from the Abbasid Caliphate and were known by nicknames. However, the Dawoodi Bohra in their religious text, Taqqarub, claim to have the true names of all 21 imams in sequence, including those of the hidden Imams: the eighth Imam Abd Allah ibn Muhammad (Ahmad al-Wafi), the ninth Imam Ahmad ibn Abd Allah (Muhammad al-Taqi), and the tenth Imam Husayn ibn Ahmad (ʿAbd Allāh al-Raḍī).

See also
 List of Isma'ili imams
 Family tree linking Prophets to Shi'ite Imams

References

 

Ismaili imams
832 births
881 deaths

9th-century Arabs